Western frog may refer to:

 Western banjo frog (Limnodynastes dorsalis), a frog in the family Myobatrachidae endemic to Western Australia
 Western bell frog (Litoria moorei), a frog in the family Hylidae found in Southwest Australia
 Western chorus frog (Pseudacris triseriata), a frog in the family Hylidae found in Canada and the United States
 Western clawed frog (Xenopus tropicalis), a frog in the family Pipidae found in Africa
 Western marsh frog (Heleioporus barycragus), a frog in the family Myobatrachidae endemic to Australia
 Western spotted frog (Heleioporus albopunctatus), a frog in the family Myobatrachidae endemic to Western Australia

See also

 Western tree frog (disambiguation)

Animal common name disambiguation pages